Blue tang is the common name of several species of surgeonfish.

These include:
Acanthurus coeruleus, a surgeonfish usually found in the Caribbean and the tropical Atlantic Ocean
Acanthurus leucosternon, a surgeonfish usually found in the tropical Indian Ocean
Paracanthurus, a surgeonfish usually found in the tropical Pacific Ocean

See also 
 Blue eyed tang